Rising Star Indonesia is a reality singing competition of Israeli origin that began airing on RCTI on 28 August 2014. This program is based on the Israeli singing competition, HaKokhav HaBa and produced by Israel-based, Keshet Media, Rising Star. The program's format lets viewers vote for contestants via mobile apps.

This format adds to the list of RCTI singing competitions along with Indonesian Idol and X Factor Indonesia. Fabian Dharmawan, the showrunner of said programs, was appointed by the network to produce the show.

The first season of Rising Star Indonesia began airing on 28 August 2014 after auditions in five cities. The finale was held on December 19, 2014. This season's panel of judges (which are referred to as "experts") consisted of Rossa, Judika, Ahmad Dhani, and Bebi Romeo. Millane Fernandez, Lilo and Andien resigned as the former main experts. The season was won by Indah Nevertari.

The second season began airing on 12 December 2016. The season was won by Andmesh Kamaleng after receiving 80% votes in his final performance.

The third season began airing on 17 December 2018 with Judika, Rossa, and Ariel "Noah" returning as experts from previous season, alongside new expert Yovie Widianto. The season was won by Elvan Saragih.

In March 2021, it was announced that Rising Star Indonesia would air a dangdut version that would be broadcast on MNCTV as Rising Star Indonesia Dangdut. The first season was won by Rezki Ramdani after receiving 85% votes in her final performance. The second season was won by Zainul Basyar after receiving 74% votes in his final performance.

List of seasons, experts, hosts and winners

Seasons timeline 

Notes

Awards and nominations

References

External links 
 

Rising Star (franchise)
Indonesian-language television shows
2014 Indonesian television series debuts
Indonesian reality television series